Hans Buchner (also Joannes Buchner, Hans von Constanz; born 26 October 1483 in Ravensburg; died March 1538, probably in Konstanz) was an important German organist and composer.

Buchner was a student of Paul Hofhaimer, and may have worked for the emperor Maximilian I while Hofhaimer was away. From 1506 he worked in Constance as the cathedral organist. His relationship with Heinrich Isaac is unclear, but three of the odd-numbered sequence verses he set are in the same transpositions as the Choralis Constantinus (he also set Victimae paschali laudes, whereas Isaac used a different Easter sequence, Laudes salvatori). When, in the course of the Reformation, the bishop was forced to move his seat to Meersburg, Buchner followed him to continue in his post, while maintaining a residence in Constance. In 1529 he applied for a position at Speyer, but apparently demanded too high a salary. He was often called to inspect new organs, such as those of Zurich and Heidelberg.

His most important legacy is the Fundamentbuch, a collection of organ music that also includes an introduction to the techniques of playing and improvising on plainchant. Buchner's Collected Organ Works (Sämtliche Orgelwerke) are edited by Jost Harro Schmidt as volumes 54 & 55 of Das Erbe deutscher Musik (Litolff/Frankfurt, 1974) Amongst his pupils was the Swiss organist and composer, Fridolin Sicher.

External links

German classical composers
Renaissance composers
German classical organists
German male organists
1483 births
1538 deaths
German male classical composers
Male classical organists